Palestine Township is one of fourteen townships in Cooper County, Missouri, USA.  As of the 2000 census, its population was 367.

Geography
According to the United States Census Bureau, Palestine Township covers an area of 44.97 square miles (116.48 square kilometers); of this, 44.92 square miles (116.34 square kilometers, 99.88 percent) is land and 0.06 square miles (0.15 square kilometers, 0.13 percent) is water.

Unincorporated towns
 Bellair at 
 Speed at 
(This list is based on USGS data and may include former settlements.)

Adjacent townships
 Boonville Township (northeast)
 Clark Fork Township (east)
 Kelly Township (south)
 Lebanon Township (southwest)
 Clear Creek Township (west)
 Pilot Grove Township (northwest)

Cemeteries
The township contains these three cemeteries: Briscoe, Concord and Concord.

Major highways
  Missouri Route 5

School districts
 Boonville School District
 Cooper County C-4
 Pilot Grove C-4

Political districts
 Missouri's 6th congressional district
 State House District 117
 State Senate District 21

References
 United States Census Bureau 2008 TIGER/Line Shapefiles
 United States Board on Geographic Names (GNIS)
 United States National Atlas

External links
 US-Counties.com
 City-Data.com

Townships in Cooper County, Missouri
Townships in Missouri